Library and Information Science Access Midwest Program (LAMP) is an Institute of Museum and Library Services funded regional network of academic libraries and information science schools working on promoting careers in library and information science.  The program looks for promising undergraduate students at its member institutions to participate in activities and events designed to increase their awareness of the profession.  The program then provides financial and mentoring support for their graduate studies at one of the member schools. LAMP specifically seeks to encourage the participation of students from statistically and historically underrepresented populations in LIS.

Participating Institutions

Illinois
Dominican University
University of Chicago
University of Illinois at Urbana-Champaign

Ohio
Ohio University-Alden Library

Michigan
Michigan State University
Wayne State University

Wisconsin
Marquette University
University of Wisconsin–Madison
University of Wisconsin–Milwaukee

Other LAMP collaborators
Kent State University
University of Michigan

References

External links
LIS Access Midwest Program
Institute of Museum and Library Services

Library-related organizations
Midwestern United States